Balanej (also Romanized as Bālānej, Bālānaj, Balānej, and Bālānj) is a village in Baranduzchay-ye Jonubi Rural District of the Central District of Urmia County, West Azerbaijan province, Iran. At the 2006 National Census, its population was 2,189 in 506 households. The following census in 2011 counted 2,407 people in 629 households. The latest census in 2016 showed a population of 3,023 people in 797 households; it was the largest village in its rural district. The village was largely inhabited by Assyrians until the Assyrian genocide.

References 

Urmia County

Populated places in West Azerbaijan Province

Populated places in Urmia County